Wei Chen-yang (born 23 February 1992 in Nantou County) is a Taiwanese retired taekwondo practitioner.  He competed in the 58 kg event at the 2012 Summer Olympics; he defeated Le Huynh Chau in the preliminary round and was eliminated by Alexey Denisenko in the quarterfinal. Wei retired from taekwondo in 2014.

References

External links
 
 

1992 births
Living people
Taiwanese male taekwondo practitioners
Olympic taekwondo practitioners of Taiwan
Taekwondo practitioners at the 2012 Summer Olympics
People from Nantou County
Asian Games medalists in taekwondo
Taekwondo practitioners at the 2010 Asian Games
Taekwondo practitioners at the 2014 Asian Games
Asian Games gold medalists for Chinese Taipei
Asian Games bronze medalists for Chinese Taipei
Medalists at the 2010 Asian Games
Medalists at the 2014 Asian Games
World Taekwondo Championships medalists
Asian Taekwondo Championships medalists
21st-century Taiwanese people